Soulful Dynamics are a band that was formed in Liberia in 1965, and arrived in Hamburg in 1969. They are best known for their 1970 hit song "Mademoiselle Ninette". Their other hits include: "Annabelle", "Birdie", "Saah-Saah-Kumba-Kumba" and "Coconuts from Congoville".

History
Originally from Liberia, they relocated to Hamburg. Soon after they recorded "Mademoiselle Ninette". By June 1970, their song was #1 in West Germany and Switzerland and #2 in Austria as recorded by Billboard. In September of that year, they had their African Fire album released which included the songs "Soy", "Down In The Dumps", "Defaliant", "Maria Shanta" and "Babalazi".

In 1976, along with Dorthe, Sonny Worthing, Catherine Ferry, Guru-Guru and the Bourbon Skiffle Company, they played at the finale of a sales convention in Kiel, Germany.

Emanuel Obedekah
Emanuel Obedekah released a some solo singles himself. One was "Romeo" bw "Mama Don't Go" in 1971. Another was "Oh Balutujeh" bw "Let Summer Come Again" in 1972.

Members 
 Emanuel Obedekah (vocals)
 Frederik "Andy" Anderson (guitar, vocals)
 Ernest J.G. Clinton (guitar, vocals)
 Manfred "Maxi" Free (guitar)
 Benjamin "Ben" Mason (drums)
 Olu Igenuma (keyboard)
 Molley Morgan (E-bass, percussions)

Later members 
 Alhaj A. Azziz aka Leo Chesson

Discography

Singles
 1970 "Annabella / Mr. Reggaeman"
 1970 "Birdie / Louisiana Race"
 1970 "Mademoiselle Ninette / Monkey"
 1971 "Saah-Saah-Kumba-Kumba / All Together"
 1972 "Coconuts aus Congoville / Azumba"
 1972 "Coconuts from Congoville / Azumba"
 1972 "Nie-Siah / Devil's Touch"
 1973 "Funny Funny Monkey / Gama Gama Gooshy"
 1973 "Lady from Amsterdam / Zon-Gele-Zor"
 1974 "Malakatra / Doctor Man"
 1974 "My Rockin' Lady"
 1974 "Sweet Honeybee / Uncle Joe"
 1975 "Crying Man"
 1975 "Mademoiselle Ninette / Annabella"
 1976 "Jungle People"
 1977 "Mirabelle"
 1977 "Shake Shake Shake / Wanna Love You"
 1982 "Dying Snowman / Tumba Tumba"

LPs
 1970 African Fire
 1971 Soulful Dynamics
 1973 Live Im Studio
 1977 Jungle People
 1977 Soulful

References

 rateyourmusic.com
 The Soulful Dynamics (in German) swisscharts.com

Liberian musicians
Musical groups established in 1965